Kampong Kasat is a village in Brunei-Muara District, Brunei, about  south of the capital Bandar Seri Begawan. The population was 1,029 in 2016. It is one of the villages within Mukim Lumapas.

Facilities 
The village's primary school is Kasat Primary School and has existed since 1903. As of 2004, it had 132 pupils and 13 teachers.

Kampong Kasat Mosque is the village mosque; it was inaugurated on 28 November 1980. The mosque can accommodate 500 worshippers.

Notes

References 

Kasat